Mike Abou-Mechrek (born October 14, 1975) is a former professional Canadian football offensive linemen. He played CIS Football for the Western Ontario Mustangs.

Season statistics

References

1975 births
Living people
Canadian football offensive linemen
Ottawa Renegades players
Canadian football people from Toronto
Players of Canadian football from Ontario
Saskatchewan Roughriders players
Western Mustangs football players
Winnipeg Blue Bombers players